Gastón Acurio Jaramillo  (born October 30, 1967) is a Peruvian chef and ambassador of Peruvian cuisine. He owns several restaurants in various countries, and is the author of several books. In Peru, he is the host of a television program and contributes to culinary magazines.

He started Pasquale Hnos., a Peruvian sangucheria or fast-food restaurant focused on Peruvian sandwiches; it did not fulfill his vision and he left the project.

In 2018 he was awarded the Lifetime Achievement Award.

Notes

Further reading
 http://www.gastroenophile.com/2013/03/interview-with-perus-gaston-acurio-by.html
 https://www.newworlder.com/article/12603/el-cocinero-gaston-acurio

External links 

 Acurio Restaurantes Official site
 Astrid & Gastón Official site
 La Mar Cebicheria Official site
 Gaston Acurio Famous Speech at Universidad del Pacifico. Video and Text. Emprendedores.PE

1967 births
Living people
Peruvian restaurateurs
Peruvian chefs
People from Lima
Alumni of Le Cordon Bleu